By the name Edeko (with various spellings:Edicon, Ediko, Edica, Ethico) are considered three contemporaneous historical figures, whom many scholars identified as one:

A prominent Hun, who served as both Attila's deputy and his ambassador to the Byzantine Empire (in 449), believed by most historians to be the father of Odoacer
Idikon or Edico, the father of Odoacer, who became a magister militum in the Roman Army and the first King of Italy (476–493). He is believed by most historians to be the same person as the prominent Hun ambassador This same Ediko is also claimed a few hundred years later as an ancestor of the ducal House of Welf (a branch of the House of Este), which is one of the ancestral houses of the House of Hanover; the Hanoverian family produced several royal dynasties, and survives to the present-day. 
A chieftain of the Sciri, who was defeated at the Battle of Bolia by the Ostrogoths at the river Bolia in Pannonia sometime in the late 460s.

Etymology
Otto Maenchen-Helfen considered the Hunnic name Έδέκων (Edekon) to be of Germanic or Germanized origin, but did not mention any derivation.

Omeljan Pritsak derived it from Old Turkic verbal root *edär- (to pursue, to follow), and deverbal noun suffix κων (kun < r-k < r-g < *gun). The reconstructed form is *edäkün (< *edär-kün; "follower, retainer").

References 

Sources
 
 
 

5th-century deaths
Germanic rulers
Germanic warriors
Sciri
Huns
Year of birth unknown
Ambassadors to the Byzantine Empire